Ludovici is an Italian and Latin language surname from the personal name Ludovicus. Notable people with the name include:
 Albert Ludovici Sr. (1820–1894), German painter
 Anthony Ludovici (1882–1971), British philosopher, sociologist, social critic and polyglot
 Carl Günther Ludovici (1707–1778), German philosopher, lexicographer and economist
 Jakob Friedrich Ludovici (1671–1723), German jurist
 Laurence James Ludovici (1910–1996), American non-fiction author

References 

Italian-language surnames
Surnames from given names
Latin-language surnames